The Sumatran flying squirrel (Hylopetes winstoni) is a flying squirrel only found on the island of Sumatra. It is listed as data deficient on the IUCN red list. Originally discovered in 1949, it is known only from a single specimen. It is a nocturnal, arboreal creature, spending most of its life in the canopy. The Sumatran flying squirrel is threatened by a restricted range and habitat loss due to logging.
Unlike most other flying squirrels, it does not have a membrane connecting to its tail.

References

External links
indonesianfauna.com

Hylopetes
Mammals of Indonesia
Mammals described in 1949
Species known from a single specimen